Chrysospalax is a small genus of mammal in the family Chrysochloridae. The two members are endemic to South Africa. It contains the following species:

 Rough-haired golden mole (Chrysospalax villosus)
 Giant golden mole (Chrysospalax trevelyani)

References

Afrosoricida
Mammal genera
Taxa named by Theodore Gill
Taxonomy articles created by Polbot